The men's 400 metre freestyle competition of the swimming events at the 2012 European Aquatics Championships took place May 21. The heats and final took place on May 21.

Records
Prior to the competition, the existing world, European and championship records were as follows.

Results

Heats
33 swimmers participated in 5 heats.

Final
The final was held at 17:02.

References

Men's 400 metre freestyle